Heavy equipment or heavy machinery or Earthmover refers to heavy-duty vehicles specially designed to execute construction tasks, most frequently involving earthwork operations or other large construction tasks. Heavy equipment usually comprises five equipment systems: the implement, traction, structure, power train, and control/information. 

Heavy equipment has been used since at least the 1st century BC when the ancient Roman engineer Vitruvius described a crane in De architectura when it was powered via human or animal labor.

Heavy equipment functions through the mechanical advantage of a simple machine, the ratio between input force applied and force exerted is multiplied, making tasks which could take hundreds of people and weeks of labor without heavy equipment far less intensive in nature. Some equipment uses hydraulic drives as a primary source of motion.

The word plant, in this context, has come to mean any type of industrial equipment, including mobile equipment (e.g. in the same sense as powerplant). However, plant originally meant "structure" or "establishment" – usually in the sense of factory or warehouse premises; as such, it was used in contradistinction to movable machinery, e.g. often in the phrase "plant and equipment".

History

The use of heavy equipment has a long history; the ancient Roman engineer Vitruvius (1st century BCE) gave descriptions of heavy equipment and cranes in ancient Rome in his treatise De architectura. The pile driver was invented around 1500. The first tunnelling shield was patented by Marc Isambard Brunel in 1818.

From horses, through steam and diesel, to electric and robotic

Until the 19th century and into the early 20th century heavy machines were drawn under human or animal power. With the advent of portable steam-powered engines the drawn machine precursors were reconfigured with the new engines, such as the combine harvester. The design of a core tractor evolved around the new steam power source into a new machine core traction engine, that can be configured as the steam tractor and the steamroller. During the 20th century, internal-combustion engines became the major power source of heavy equipment. Kerosene and ethanol engines were used, but today diesel engines are dominant. Mechanical transmission was in many cases replaced by hydraulic machinery. The early 20th century also saw new electric-powered machines such as the forklift. Caterpillar Inc. is a present-day brand from these days, starting out as the Holt Manufacturing Company. The first mass-produced heavy machine was the Fordson tractor in 1917.

The first commercial continuous track vehicle was the 1901 Lombard Steam Log Hauler. The use of tracks became popular for tanks during World War I, and later for civilian machinery like the bulldozer. The largest engineering vehicles and mobile land machines are bucket-wheel excavators, built since the 1920s.

"Until almost the twentieth century, one simple tool constituted the primary earthmoving machine: the hand shovel – moved with animal and human powered, sleds, barges, and wagons. This tool was the principal method by which material was either sidecast or elevated to load a conveyance, usually a wheelbarrow, or a cart or wagon drawn by a draft animal. In antiquity, an equivalent of the hand shovel or hoe and head basket—and masses of men—were used to move earth to build civil works. Builders have long used the inclined plane, levers, and pulleys to place solid building materials, but these labor-saving devices did not lend themselves to earthmoving, which required digging, raising, moving, and placing loose materials. The two elements required for mechanized earthmoving, then as now, were an independent power source and off-road mobility, neither of which could be provided by the technology of that time."

Container cranes were used from the 1950s and onwards, and made containerization possible.

Nowadays such is the importance of this machinery, some transport companies have developed specific equipment to transport heavy construction equipment to and from sites.

Most of the major equipment manufacturers such as Caterpillar, Volvo, Liebherr, and Bobcat have released or have been developing fully or partially electric-powered heavy equipment. Commercially-available models and R&D models were announced in 2019 and 2020.

Robotics and autonomy has been a growing concern for heavy equipment manufacturers with manufacturers beginning research and technology acquisition. A number of companies are currently developing (Caterpillar and Bobcat) or have launched (Built Robotics) commercial solutions to the market.

Types
These subdivisions, in this order, are the standard heavy equipment categorization.

Track-type
Agricultural tractors
Bulldozer
Snowcat
Skidder
Track-type tractors (Bulldozer)
Tractor
Military engineering vehicles

Grader
Grader
SkidSteer
Skid steer loader

Excavator
Amphibious excavator
Compact excavator
Dragline excavator
Dredger
Bucket-wheel excavator
Excavator (digger)
Long reach excavator
Power shovel
Reclaimer
Steam shovel
Suction excavator
Walking Excavator
Trencher (machine)
Yarder

Backhoe
Backhoe
Backhoe loader

Timber
Feller buncher
Harvester
Skidder
Track harvester
Wheel forwarder
Wheel skidder

Pipelayer
Pipelayer (sideboom)

Scraper
Fresno scraper
Scraper
Wheel tractor-scraper (belly scraper)
Mining
Construction & mining tractor
Construction & mining trucks
Mining equipment
Haul truck
Articulated
Articulated hauler
Articulated truck

Compactor
Wheel dozers – soil compactors
Soil stabilizer

Loader
Loader
Skip loader (skippy)
Wheel loader (front loader, integrated tool carrier)

Track loader
Track loader

Material handler
Aerial work platform / Lift table
Cherry picker
Crane
Block-setting crane
Bulk-handling crane
Crane vessel
Container crane
Gantry crane
Overhead crane
Electric overhead traveling crane
Railroad crane
Ring crane
Level luffing crane
Mobile crane
Travel lift
Forklift
Knuckleboom loader (trailer mount) & Knuckleboom loader (trailer mount)
Straddle carrier
Sidelifter
Reach stacker
Telescopic handlers

Paving
Asphalt paver
Asphalt plant
Cold planer
Cure rig
Paver
Pavement milling
Pneumatic tire compactor
Roller (road roller or roller compactor)
Slipform paver
Vibratory compactor, Compactor

Underground
Roadheader
Tunnel boring machine
Underground mining equipment

Hydromatic tool
Ballast tamper
Attachments
Drilling machine
Pile driver
Rotary tiller (rototiller, rotovator)

Hydraulic machinery

Highway
Dump truck
Highway 10 yard rear dump
Highway bottom dump (stiff), pup (belly train), triple
Highway end dump and side dump
Highway transfer, Transfer train
Highway transit-mixer
Lowboy (trailer)
Street sweeper

Images

Implements and hydromechanical work tools

auger
backhoe
bale spear
broom
bulldozer blade
clam shell bucket
cold plane
demolition shears
equipment bucket
excavator bucket
forks
grapple
hydraulic hammer, hoe ram
hydraulics
hydraulic tilting bucket (4-in-1)
landscape tiller
material handling arm
mechanical pulverizer, crusher
multi processor
pavement removal bucket
pile driver
power take-off (PTO)
quick coupler
rake
ripper
rotating grab
sheep's foot compactor
skeleton bucket
snow blower
stump grinder
stump shear
thumb
tiltrotator
trencher
vibratory plate compactor
wheel saw

Traction: Off-the-road tires and tracks

Heavy equipment requires specialized tires for various construction applications. While many types of equipment have continuous tracks applicable to more severe service requirements, tires are used where greater speed or mobility is required. An understanding of what equipment will be used for during the life of the tires is required for proper selection. Tire selection can have a significant impact on production and unit cost. There are three types of off-the-road tires, transport for earthmoving machines, work for slow moving earthmoving machines, and load and carry for transporting as well as digging. Off-highway tires have six categories of service C compactor, E earthmover, G grader, L loader, LS log-skidder and ML mining and logging. Within these service categories are various tread types designed for use on hard-packed surface, soft surface and rock. Tires are a large expense on any construction project, careful consideration should be given to prevent excessive wear or damage.

Heavy equipment operator

A heavy equipment operator drives and operates heavy equipment used in engineering and construction projects. Typically only skilled workers may operate heavy equipment, and there is specialized training for learning to use heavy equipment.

Much publication about heavy equipment operators focuses on improving safety for such workers. The field of occupational medicine researches and makes recommendations about safety for these and other workers in safety-sensitive positions.

Equipment cost

Due to the small profit margins on construction projects it is important to maintain accurate records concerning equipment utilization, repairs and maintenance. The two main categories of equipment costs are ownership cost and operating cost.

Ownership cost

To classify as an ownership cost an expense must have been incurred regardless of if the equipment is used or not. These costs are as follows:

purchase expense
salvage value
tax savings from depreciation
major repairs and overhauls
property taxes
insurance
storage

Depreciation can be calculated several ways, the simplest is the straight-line method. The annual depreciation is constant, reducing the equipment value annually. The following are simple equations paraphrased from the Peurifoy & Schexnayder text:

Operating cost
For an expense to be classified as an operating cost, it must be incurred through use of the equipment. These costs are as follows:

The biggest distinction from a cost standpoint is if a repair is classified as a major repair or a minor repair. A major repair can change the depreciable equipment value due to an extension in service life, while a minor repair is normal maintenance. How a firm chooses to cost major and minor repairs vary from firm to firm depending on the costing strategies being used. Some firms will charge only major repairs to the equipment while minor repairs are costed to a project. Another common costing strategy is to cost all repairs to the equipment and only frequently replaced wear items are excluded from the equipment cost. Many firms keep their costing structure closely guarded as it can impact the bidding strategies of their competition. In a company with multiple semi-independent divisions, the equipment department often wants to classify all repairs as "minor" and charge the work to a job – therefore improving their 'profit' from the equipment.

Models

Die-cast metal promotional scale models of heavy equipment are often produced for each vehicle to give to prospective customers. These are typically in 1:50 scale. The popular manufacturers of these models are Conrad and NZG in Germany, even for US vehicles.

Notable manufacturers
The largest 10 construction equipment manufacturers in 2020 based on revenue data of top 50 manufacturers published by KHL Group 

Other manufacturers include:

Atlas Copco
BEML Limited
Bobcat Company
Case Construction Equipment
Chelyabinsk Tractor Plant
CNH Global
Demag
Fiat-Allis
HEPCO
HIAB
Hidromek
Hyundai Heavy Industries
Ingersoll Rand
JCB
Kubota
Kobelco
LiuGong
MARAIS
Navistar International Corporation
NCK
New Holland
Track Marshall
Orenstein and Koppel GmbH (O&K)
Paccar
Poclain
Rototilt
Shantui
ST Kinetics
Takeuchi Manufacturing
Wacker Neuson
Yanmar
Zoomlion

See also

Construction equipment theft
Non-road engine
Associated Equipment Distributors, the trade association for heavy equipment distributors

References